The ASEAN University Network (AUN) is an Asian university association. It was founded in November 1995 by ASEAN member countries including 13 universities. After the enlargement of ASEAN by the ASEAN Charter in 1997 and 1999, the AUN membership has been increasing.

Structure
The ASEAN University Network (AUN) is an arrangement between 30 universities in the ten ASEAN countries. The AUN is composed of a Board of Trustees (BOT), the participating universities, and the AUN Secretariat. The Board of Trustees consists of one representative from each of the ASEAN Member Countries, the Secretary-General of ASEAN, the Chairman of the ASEAN subcommittee on Education (ASCOE) and the executive director of the AUN. The BOT has the task of formulating policies, approving project proposals, the allocation of budgets and co-ordinating implementation activities. The board makes decisions on these activities on the basis of consensus. The participating universities have the task of implementing the AUN programmes and activities. When AUN was founded in 1995, it consisted of thirteen universities from seven countries. Due to the inclusion of Myanmar, Laos and Cambodia in ASEAN, the network grew to 21 members. Although numerous applications for membership have been received, it was decided to only admit universities from the new member countries. Non members from the region however, are invited as observers on a regular basis. The AUN Secretariat is involved in the planning, organisation, monitoring and evaluation of AUN activities and also in the development of new ideas and the acquisition of funding. The permanent office of the Secretariat was established in 2000 and is located on the campus of Chulalongkorn University in Bangkok. The operating costs of the secretariat are (at least until 2005) allocated by the Thai Government.

The financing of AUN activities comes from either cost sharing between the participating universities or from the external 'dialogue partners' of ASEAN. The dialogue partners are Australia, Canada, China, EU, India, Japan, New Zealand, ROK, Russia and the United States. The United Nations Development Program (UNDP) also has dialogue status.

The meetings within the AUN Framework are financed by the hosts and travel expenses by the (universities of the) participants, or by universities from the richer countries for the poorer countries.

Development
The ASEAN University Network emerged from a highly ambitious idea of the ASEAN leaders and the ASEAN Subcommittee on Education (ASCOE) to establish an ASEAN University. A year after this idea was launched, it became clear that this would present too many problems concerning funding, location and leadership. Therefore, in 1994, it was decided that the founding of a network of existing institutions would be more feasible. In its early years (1995–1999), the AUN focused mainly on the sharing of knowledge and experiences and on small-scale student and staff exchange. As from 1999, the collaborative activities became more complex with programmes like joint curriculum development, co-operation in ICT and the establishment of sub-networks. This is not only the case for intra-ASEAN co-operation but also for the activities with the dialogue partners.

This also led to the establishment of a permanent secretariat in Bangkok in March 2000. Although there existed a secretariat since 1997, this secretariat was temporary. With the permanent office also came an increase in structural funding for the secretariat. In addition to the operating costs for the AUN secretariat, also the financial support for AUN activities increased substantially since 1999. In addition to a growth in financial terms, projects also became more comprehensive. In particular, the AUN Quality Assurance programme has very ambitious goals with consequences that transcend the disciplinary boundaries. This can also form a turning point in the sense that through such projects all members of the participating universities will be affected. Many of the current activities are focused on particular individuals of the universities, and many other students and staff that are not involved in activities are not familiar with AUN and its activities. Most exchanges and gatherings for instance, although successful, have been modest in its impact on the universities as a whole. An explanation for this lies in the top-down character of the activities, with a high involvement of the university's central level (and in some countries the ministry level) and only modest involvement of the faculties.

AUN Core member universities
Currently, AUN is composed of 30 core member universities across 10 ASEAN countries:

 University of Brunei Darussalam (UBD) (Bandar Seri Begawan)

 Royal University of Law and Economics (RULE) (Phnom Penh)
 Royal University of Phnom Penh (RUPP) (Phnom Penh)

 Institut Teknologi Bandung (ITB) (Bandung)
 Universitas Airlangga (UNAIR) (Surabaya)
 Universitas Gadjah Mada (UGM) (Yogyakarta)
 Universitas Indonesia (UI) (Jakarta)

 National University of Laos (NUOL) (Vientiane)

 National University of Malaysia (UKM) (Bangi, Selangor)
 University of Malaya (UM) (Kuala Lumpur)
 Prince University of Malaysia (UPM) (Serdang, Selangor)
 Science University of Malaysia (USM) (Gelugor, Penang)
 Northern University of Malaysia (UUM) (Sintok, Kedah)

 University of Mandalay (MU) (Mandalay)
 University of Yangon (UY) (Yangon)
 Yangon University of Economics (YUE) (former Yangon Institute of Economics) (Yangon)

 Ateneo de Manila University (AdMU) (Quezon City)
 De La Salle University (DLSU) (Manila)
 University of the Philippines (UP) (Quezon City)

 Nanyang Technological University (NTU) (Singapore West)
 National University of Singapore (NUS) (Singapore Central)
 Singapore Management University (SMU) (Singapore Central)

 Burapha University (BUU) (Chonburi)
 Chiang Mai University (CMU) (Chiang Mai)
 Chulalongkorn University (CU) (Bangkok)
 Mahidol University (MU) (Bangkok, Nakhon Pathom)
 Prince of Songkla University (PSU) (Songkla)

 Can Tho University (CTU) (Can Tho)
 Vietnam National University, Hanoi (VNU-Hanoi) (Hanoi)
 Vietnam National University, Ho Chi Minh City (VNU-HCM) (Ho Chi Minh City)

AUN Associate member universities 
Currently, AUN is composed of 165 associate member universities across 9 ASEAN countries:

 Universiti Islam Sultan Sharif Ali
 Universiti Teknologi Brunei

 Build Bright University
 Cam Ed Institute
 Institute of Technology of Cambodia
 National University of Management
 Svay Rieng University Cambodia
 University of South-East Asia

 Institut Pertanian Bogor
 Institut Teknologi Sepuluh Nopember
 London School of Public Relations Jakarta (Institut Komunikasi dan Bisnis LSPR)
 Parahyangan Catholic University
 Petra Christian University
 State Islamic University of Yogyakarta
 Syiah Kuala University
 Universitas Ahmad Dahlan
 Universitas Andalas
 Universitas Bina Nusantara
 Universitas Brawijaya
 Universitas Diponegoro
 Universitas Gunadarma
 Universitas Hasanuddin
 University of Hayam Wuruk Perbanas
 Universitas Islam Indonesia
 Universitas Islam Negeri Sunan Gunung Djati Bandung
 Universitas Islam Negeri Syarif Hidayatullah Jakarta
 Universitas Islam Negeri Walisongo
 Universitas Islam Negeri Maulana Malik Ibrahim Malang
 Universitas Jember
 Universitas Katolik Indonesia Atma Jaya
 Universitas Katolik Widya Mandala Surabaya
 Universitas Lampung
 Universitas Muhammadiyah Malang
 Universitas Muhammadiyah Surakarta
 Universitas Muhammadiyah Yogyakarta
 Universitas Multimedia Nusantara
 Universitas Negeri Malang
 Universitas Negeri Padang
 Universitas Negeri Semarang
 Universitas Negeri Surabaya
 Universitas Negeri Yogyakarta
 Universitas Pendidikan Indonesia
 University of Pembangunan Nasional Veteran Jakarta
 Universitas Sam Ratulangi
 Universitas Sanata Dharma
 Universitas Sebelas Maret
 Universitas Sembilanbelas November Kolaka
 Universitas Sultan Ageng Tirtayasa
 Universitas Sumatera Utara
 Universitas Surabaya
 Universitas Telkom
 Universitas Trisakti
 Universitas Udayana

 Allianze University College of Medical Sciences
 Asia Pacific University of Technology & Innovation
 International Medical University
 International University of Malaya-Wales
 Limkokwing University of Creative Technology
 Lincoln University College, Malaysia
 Management & Science University
 Nilai University
 Nottingham University Malaysia
 Open University Malaysia
 Perbadanan Putrajaya
 Sunway University College
 Universiti Islam Antarabangsa
 Universiti Kuala Lumpur
 Universiti Malaysia Sarawak
 Universiti Malaysia Kelantan
 Universiti Malaysia Pahang
 Universiti Malaysia Perlis
 Universiti Malaysia Sabah
 Universiti Perguruan Sultan Idris
 Universiti Teknologi Malaysia
 Universiti Teknologi MARA
 Universiti Tun Abdul Razak
 Universiti Tun Hussein Onn Malaysia
 Universiti Tunku Abdul Rahman

 Mandalay Technological University
 Myanmar Aerospace Engineering University
 Myanmar Maritime University
 Technological University (Hmawbi)
 Technological University (Kyaukse)
 Technological University (Thanlyin)
 University of Co-operative and Management, Thanlyin
 University of Information Technology
 Yangon Technological University
 West Yangon Technological University

 Adventist International Institute of Advanced Studies
 Cagayan State University
 Cebu Technological University
 Centro Escolar University
 Central Luzon State University
 De La Salle–College of Saint Benilde
 De La Salle Medical and Health Sciences Institute
 Holy Angel University
 Lyceum of the Philippines University-Batangas
 Mapua University
 Mindanao State University-Iligan Institute of Technology
 Notre Dame of Marbel University
 University of St. La Salle
 Far Eastern University
 Technological Institute of the Philippines
 Trinity University of Asia
 University of the East, Manila
 University of the Immaculate Conception
 University of San Jose–Recoletos
 University of Santo Tomas
 University of Southeastern Philippines
 Visayas State University
 Xavier University - Ateneo de Cagayan

 Singapore University of Technology and Design

 Assumption University
 Kasetsart University
 King Mongkut's Institute of Technology Ladkrabang
 King Mongkut's University of Technology North Bangkok
 King Mongkut's University of Technology Thonburi
 Mae Fah Luang University
 Mahasarakham University
 Lampang Rajabhat University
 Rajamangala University of Technology Thanyaburi
 Silpakorn University
 Srinakharinwirot University

 Ho Chi Minh University of Banking
 Foreign Trade University
 Dalat University
 FPT University
 Hanoi Architectural University
 Hanoi University of Mining and Geology
 Hanoi University Of Public Health
 Hanoi University of Science and Technology
 Ho Chi Minh City Open University
 Ho Chi Minh City University of Education
 Ho Chi Minh City University of Food Industry
 Ho Chi Minh City University of Technology
 Ho Chi Minh City University of Technology and Education
 Ho Chi Minh City University of Transport
 Hoa Sen University
 Hong Bang International University
 Huế University
 Hung Yen University of Technology and Education
 Industrial University of Ho Chi Minh City
 Lạc Hồng University
 National University of Civil Engineering
 Nguyen Tat Thanh University
 Nông Lâm University
 Saigon Technology University
 Saigon University
 Tay Nguyen University
 Thai Nguyen University
 University of Đà Nẵng
 Thủ Dầu Một University
 Thủy Lợi University
 Tôn Đức Thắng University
 Tra Vinh University
 University of Architecture Ho Chi Minh City
 University of Economics Ho Chi Minh City
 University of Medicine and Pharmacy at Ho Chi Minh City
 University of Social Sciences & Humanities
 University of Transport and Communications
 Văn Hiến University
 Văn Lang University
 Vietnam Maritime University
 Vietnam National University of Agriculture
 Vinh University

Notes

References
  Australian Government. Department of Foreign Affairs and Trade
 AUN enlargement
 
 ASEAN nations Home page

External links
 The AUN Secretariat - official website, including member universities

 
College and university associations and consortia in Asia
International college and university associations and consortia